Anti-computer tactics are methods used by humans to try to beat computer opponents at various games, especially in board games such as chess and Arimaa. It often involves playing conservatively for a long-term advantage that the computer is unable to find in its game tree search. This will frequently involve selecting moves that appear suboptimal in the short term in order to exploit known weaknesses in the way computer players evaluate positions.

In human–computer chess matches
One example of the use of anti-computer tactics was Brains in Bahrain, an eight-game chess match between human chess grandmaster, and then World Champion, Vladimir Kramnik and the computer program Deep Fritz 7, held in October 2002. The match ended in a tie 4–4, with two wins for each participant and four draws, worth half a point each.

In the 1997 Deep Blue versus Garry Kasparov match, Kasparov played an anti-computer tactic move at the start of the game to get Deep Blue out of its opening book. Kasparov chose the unusual Mieses Opening and thought that the computer would play the opening poorly if it had to play itself (that is, rely on its own skills rather than use its opening book). Kasparov played similar anti-computer openings in the other games of the match, but the tactic backfired.

Anti-computer chess games
Garry Kasparov vs Deep Blue (Computer) IBM Man-Machine, New York USA 1997
Garry Kasparov vs X3D Fritz (Computer) Man-Machine World Chess Championship 2003
Rybka (Computer) vs Hikaru Nakamura ICC blitz 3 0 2008

See also
Arimaa – a chess derivative designed to be difficult for computers, inspired by Kasparov's loss to Deep Blue in 1997.
Horizon effect
Human–computer chess matches

References

External links
 Anticomputer Chess

Computer chess